Giovanni Marquet (died 1499) was a Roman Catholic prelate who served as Bishop of Patti (1494–1499).

Biography
Giovanni Marquet was ordained a priest in the Order of Preachers. On 16 June 1494, he was appointed by Pope Alexander VI as Bishop of Patti. He served as Bishop of Patti until his death in 1499.

References

External links and additional sources
 (for Chronology of Bishops) 
 (for Chronology of Bishops) 

1499 deaths
15th-century Roman Catholic bishops in Sicily
Bishops appointed by Pope Alexander VI
Dominican bishops